The Guadeloupe Division of Honour (French: Guadeloupe Division d'Honneur) is the top football league in Guadeloupe. It was created in 1952 and is headed by the Guadeloupean League of Football. 14 teams participate in this league.  The last 3 placed teams are relegated to the Honorary Promotion Championship.

As Guadeloupe is both a member of CONCACAF and the French Football Federation, Guadeloupean teams are eligible to participate in three international competitions: the CFU Club Championship, CONCACAF Champions League, and the Coupe de France.

Clubs competing in the 2022–23 season

Poule A

CS Capesterrien (Capesterre-Belle-Eau)
CERFA (Les Abymes)
La Gauloise (Basse-Terre)
AS Gosier (Le Gosier)
Jeunesse Évolution (Les Abymes)
CS Moulien (Le Moule)
Red Star (Baie-Mahault)
Sporting B/M (Baie-Mahault)
JS Vieux-Habitants (Vieux-Habitants)

Poule B

Dynamo Le Moule (Le Moule)
L'Etoile (Morne-à-l'Eau)
AO Gourbeyrienne (Gourbeyre)
Juventus SA (Sainte-Anne)
Le Phare (Petit-Canal)
Siroco (Les Abymes)
Solidarité SC (Baie-Mahault)
Stade Lamentinois (Lamentin)
U.S.B.M. (Baie-Mahault)

Relegated in 2021/22

Amical Club (Grand-Bourg de Marie Galante)
Arsenal Club (Petit-Bourg)
Club Amical Marquisat (Capesterre-Belle-Eau)
Racing Club (Basse-Terre)

Relegated in 2016/17
U.S.C. de Bananier (Capesterre-Belle-Eau)
AS Gosier (Le Gosier)
Red Star (Baie Mahault)

Relegated in 2015/16
L'Etoile (Morne-à-l'Eau)
Solidarité SC (Baie-Mahault)
Club Amical Marquisat (Capesterre-Belle-Eau)

Relegated in 2014/15
AS Gosier (Le Gosier)
Racing Club (Basse-Terre)

Relegated in 2013/14
AJSS Saintes (Terre-de-Haut)
CS Capesterrien (Capesterre-Belle-Eau)
JS Vieux-Habitants (Vieux-Habitants)

Relegated in 2012/13
Evolucas (Petit-Bourg)
Phare du Canal (Petit-Canal)
Stade Lamentinois (Lamentin)

Relegated in 2011/12
Amical Club (Grand-Bourg de Marie Galante)
Etoile du Carmel (Basse-Terre)
Racing Club (Basse-Terre)

Relegated in 2010/11
AS Dragon (Gosier)
La Gauloise (Basse-Terre)
Red Star (Baie Mahault)

Previous winners

1937: unknown
1938-39: unknown
1940: AS Redoutable (Pointe-à-Pitre)
1941: Cygne Noir (Basse-Terre)
1942: AS Redoutable (Pointe-à-Pitre)
1943: Racing Club (Basse-Terre)
1944–45: CS Moulien (Le Moule)
1945–46: unknown
1946–47: CS Moulien (Le Moule)
1947–48: CS Moulien (Le Moule)
1948–49: CS Moulien (Le Moule)
1949–50: Racing Club (Basse-Terre)
1950–51: CS Moulien (Le Moule)
1951–52: Red Star (Pointe-à-Pitre)  
1952–53: CS Moulien (Le Moule)
1953–54: Arsenal (Petit-Bourg)
1954–55: CS Moulien (Le Moule)
1955–56: CS Moulien (Le Moule)
1956–57: CS Capesterrien (Capesterre-Belle-Eau)
1957–58: unknown
1958–59: unknown
1959–60: La Gauloise (Basse-Terre)
1960–61: unknown
1961–62: CS Capesterrien (Capesterre-Belle-Eau)
1962–63: Cygne Noir (Basse-Terre)
1963–64: CS Capesterrien (Capesterre-Belle-Eau)
1964–65: CS Moulien (Le Moule)
1965–66: Red Star (Pointe-à-Pitre)
1966–67: Juventus SA (Sainte-Anne)
1967–68: Racing Club (Basse-Terre)
1968–69: Juventus SA (Sainte-Anne)
1969–70: Red Star (Pointe-à-Pitre)
1970–71: La Gauloise (Basse-Terre)
1971–72: Cygne Noir (Basse-Terre)
1972–73: Juventus SA (Sainte-Anne)
1973–74: Juventus SA (Sainte-Anne)
1974–75: Juventus SA (Sainte-Anne)
1975–76: Juventus SA (Sainte-Anne)
1976–77: La Gauloise (Basse-Terre)
1977–78: La Gauloise (Basse-Terre)
1978–79: Juventus SA (Sainte-Anne)
1979–80: L'Etoile (Morne-à-l'Eau)
1980–81: L'Etoile (Morne-à-l'Eau)
1981–82: L'Etoile (Morne-à-l'Eau)
1982–83: Cygne Noir (Basse-Terre)
1983–84: JS Capesterre (Capesterre-de-Marie-Galante)
1984–85: CS Moulien (Le Moule)
1985–86: US Ansoise (Anse-Bertrand)
1986–87: US Ansoise (Anse-Bertrand)
1987–88: Solidarité SC (Baie-Mahault)
1988–89: Zénith (Morne-à-l'Eau)
1989–90: Solidarité SC (Baie-Mahault)
1990–91: Solidarité SC (Baie-Mahault)
1991–92: Solidarité SC (Baie-Mahault)
1992–93: Solidarité SC (Baie-Mahault)
1993–94: CS Moulien (Le Moule)
1994–95: Arsenal (Petit-Bourg)
1995–96: L'Etoile (Morne-à-l'Eau)
1996–97: L'Etoile (Morne-à-l'Eau)
1997–98: L'Etoile (Morne-à-l'Eau)
1998–99: Racing Club (Basse-Terre)
1999–00: Juventus SA (Sainte-Anne)
2000–01: L'Etoile (Morne-à-l'Eau)
2001–02: L'Etoile (Morne-à-l'Eau)
2002–03: Phare du Canal (Petit-Canal)
2003–04: Racing Club (Basse-Terre)
2004–05: AS Gosier (Le Gosier)
2005–06: JS Vieux-Habitants (Vieux-Habitants)
2006–07: L'Etoile (Morne-à-l'Eau)
2007–08: Evolucas (Petit-Bourg)
2008–09: Moulien (Le Moule)
2009–10: JS Vieux-Habitants (Vieux-Habitants)
2010–11: Moulien (Le Moule)
2011–12: AJSS Saintes (Terre-de-Haut)
2012–13: Moulien (Le Moule)
2013–14: Moulien (Le Moule)
2014–15: Moulien (Le Moule)
2015–16: USR (Sainte-Rose)
2016–17: USR (Sainte-Rose)
2017–18: CS Moulien (Le Moule)
2018–19: Amical Club (Grand-Bourg)
2019–20 : Gosier (Le Gosier)
2020–21 : Gosier (Le Gosier)
2021–22 : Solidarité SC (Baie-Mahault)

Appearances By Club

Top scorers

References

External links
France - D.O.M. - Guadeloupe - List of Champions, RSSSF.com
Guadeloupe Division of Honor summary (SOCCERWAY)

 
Football competitions in Guadeloupe
Top level football leagues in the Caribbean
Football leagues in Overseas France
1937 establishments in Guadeloupe
Sports leagues established in 1937